Atomic Saké is a Canadian short drama film, directed by Louise Archambault and released in 1999. The film centres on Ariane (Audrey Benoit), Véronique (Suzanne Clément) and Mathilde (Noémie Godin-Vigneau), three female friends talking over drinks who decide to reveal their innermost secrets, including Mathilde's revelation that she is in love with Ariane and tries to come out to her.

The film has been described by critics as having a Rashomon-like structure of shifting perspectives on the subjective nature of truth.

The film premiered at Montreal's Festival du nouveau cinéma in 1999, and was later screened at festivals including the 2000 Toronto International Film Festival and the 2001 Inside Out Film and Video Festival.

The film won the Prix Jutra for Best Short Film at the 2nd Jutra Awards.

References

External links
 

1999 films
1999 short films
1999 LGBT-related films
Canadian drama short films
Canadian LGBT-related short films
Lesbian-related films
Films directed by Louise Archambault
1990s French-language films
French-language Canadian films
1990s Canadian films